Pania della Croce is a mountain (1,858 m) in the Alpi Apuane, in Tuscany, central Italy. It is the highest peak in the Panie Group (Gruppo delle Panie), located not far from the Tyrrhenian Sea coast.

On very clear days Monviso, (in Piedmont), Monte Amiata and Corsica can all be seen from its summit, together with the tyrrhenian coastline.

Mountains of Tuscany
Mountains of the Apennines